Albrechtice nad Vltavou is a municipality and village in Písek District in the South Bohemian Region of the Czech Republic. It has about 1,000 inhabitants.

Administrative parts
Villages of Hladná, Chřešťovice, Jehnědno, Údraž and Újezd are administrative parts of Albrechtice nad Vltavou.

Geography
It lies in the Tábor Uplands. The entire eastern municipal border is formed by the Vltava River.

History
The first written mention of Albrechtice is from 1352, the church was first mentioned in 1360. In the second half of the 16th century, Albrechtice was owned by the knights Oudražský of Kestřany. After the Battle of White Mountain in 1620, Albrechtice was acquired by Baltasar Marradas and joined to the Hluboká estate. Albrechtice was then a market town, but it was destroyed during the Thirty Years' War and in 1635, Albrechtice ceased to be a market town and became a village. In the following centuries, it was owned by various lower nobles.

Sights
The major sight is a Romanesque Church of Saints Peter and Paul from the late 12th century with a churchyard. The walls of the churchyard have a unique arcade decoration with paintings and moralizing verses from the 19th century.

Twin towns – sister cities

Albrechtice nad Vltavou is twinned with:
 Siselen, Switzerland

References

External links

 

Villages in Písek District